Amida can mean :

Places and jurisdictions 
 Amida (Mesopotamia), now Diyarbakır, an ancient city in Asian Turkey; it is (nominal) seat of :
 The Chaldean Catholic Archeparchy of Amida 
 The Latin titular Metropolitan see of Amida of the Romans
 The Armenian Catholic titular see Amida of the Armenians
 The Syrian Catholic (Antiochian Rite) titular Metropolitan see Amida of the Syriacs
 Mount Amida, mountain in Saeki-ku, Hiroshima, Japan

Other 
 Amitābha Buddha, in Japanese
 Amida (beetle), a beetle genus
 Amida, a ladder climbing puzzle video game

See also 
 Amidah, the central prayer of Jewish worship
 Amidakuji, a way of drawing lots
 Aëtius of Amida, 6th century medical writer